Blandine Rinkel (born 29 March 1991 Rezé ) is a French journalist, musician and writer. She was nominated for the 2018  Prix Goncourt first novel. She won the 2022  Prix Méduse.

In 2015, she graduated from the Ecole des Hautes Etudes en Sciences Sociales (EHESS).

Her work appeared in  Le Matricule des anges, Citizen K, Gonzaï and France Inter.

Works 

 L'Abandon des prétentions, Fayard, 2017.  
 Le nom secret des choses : roman, Fayard, 2019. 
 Vers la violence : roman, Librairie Arthème Fayard, 2022.

References

External links 

 Gaëlle Josse et Blandine Rinkel : au nom du père, 26 September 2022

1991 births
French novelists
French journalists
People from Loire-Atlantique
Living people